Whitefield J. McKinlay (September 15, 1852 – December 14, 1941) was a teacher, state legislator, and real estate businessman who lived in Charleston, South Carolina and then Washington D.C. The Library of Congress has a glass plate negative portrait of him. In other photographs he is among leaders of Charleston's African American community. He was a Republican. Many of his letters remain.

He was born in Charleston, South Carolina to George and Mary E. Weston McKinlay. He studied at Avery Institute, West Point, Iowa College and the University of South Carolina. His years at the University of South Carolina during the Reconstruction era when it was opened up to African Americans ended when Democrats regained control.

He was elected to serve in South Carolina's 1868 legislature along with numerous other African Americans and Republicans.

He married Kate Wheeler and moved to Washington D.C. as conditions for African Americans deteriorated for African Americans in South Carolina. Washington D.C. became less inclusive in the years after their arrival as Democrats held power and Jim Crow era segregation took hold. McKinlay was invited to attend the dedication of the Lincoln Memorial in 1922. He and other African American guests learned they were to be segregated in a separate section upon arrival.

References

1852 births
1941 deaths
Politicians from Charleston, South Carolina
South Carolina Republicans
19th-century American politicians
African-American politicians during the Reconstruction Era
University of South Carolina alumni
African-American state legislators in South Carolina
United States Military Academy alumni
Grinnell College alumni
African-American businesspeople
19th-century American educators
American real estate businesspeople
Businesspeople from South Carolina
19th-century American businesspeople
20th-century African-American people